Giuliano Sarti (2 October 1933 – 5 June 2017) was an Italian professional football player, who played in the position of goalkeeper. Throughout his successful career, he played for several Italian clubs, although he is mostly remembered for his success with Fiorentina, and as the goalkeeper of the "Grande Inter" side of the 1960s that conquered both Italy and Europe.

Club career
Sarti is mostly remembered for his successful stints at Fiorentina and Internazionale, clubs with which he won several domestic and international trophies. After starting his career in the lower divisions with season long stints at Centese (1952–53) and Bondenese (1953–54), he moved to Fiorentina in 1954, where he soon managed to obtain a place in the team's starting line-up despite competition from Leonardo Costagliola initially, and later Enrico Albertosi. During his time with the club (1954–63), he won the Serie A, the Coppa Italia and the European Cup Winners' Cup titles.

Sarti is particularly regarded for his role as the starting keeper in the highly successful "Grande Inter" side of the 1960s under manager Helenio Herrera. He joined the club in 1963, and during his time with the team, he formed a legendary partnership with fullbacks Burgnich and Facchetti, as well as sweeper Armando Picchi, in Inter's tenacious "catenaccio" defence that helped the team to conquer Italian, European, and World football. During his five seasons with the club, he won two Serie A titles, two European Cups, and two Intercontinental Cups. After leaving Inter in 1968, he later spent the 1968–69 season with Juventus as a back-up to Roberto Anzolin. He subsequently joined Unione Valdinievole the following season, where he remained until his retirement in 1973.

International career
Sarti also represented Italy eight times throughout his career between 1959–1967, although he was never called up for a major tournament with Italy due to competition from several other notable Italian goalkeepers at the time. He made his international debut on 29 November 1959, in a 1–1 home draw against Hungary.

Style of play
Sarti is regarded by pundits as one of the greatest and most successful Italian goalkeepers both of his generation, and of all time. A consistent and reliable keeper known for his shot-stopping abilities, he was also highly regarded for his composure, personality and strong mentality, as well as his positional sense in goal, which enabled him to make efficient rather than spectacular saves which relied more on athleticism.

He was also known for revolutionising the role of the goalkeeper in Italy, functioning as a "sweeper keeper", due to his tendency to rush off his line to anticipate opposing strikers, or to be involved in the build-up of plays by coming out of his area to receive or play the ball out to his defenders. In one on one situations, however, he usually preferred to remain closer to his line and position himself with his body constantly facing the shooter, in order to increase the distance between himself and his opponent, giving him more time to parry the ball; this playing style, which was later described as "geometric" rather than "reactive" by Sarti, was considered unusual for the time, but very effective.

After retirement
Sarti retired from professional football in 1969, after one season with Juventus. After retiring, he also worked as a manager for Lucchese.

Death
Sarti died in Florence on 5 June 2017, at the age of 83, after a sudden illness.

Honours

Club
Fiorentina
 Serie A: 1955–56
 Coppa Italia: 1960–61
 UEFA Cup Winners' Cup: 1960–61

Inter
 Serie A: 1964–65, 1965–66
 European Cup: 1963–64, 1964–65
 Intercontinental Cup: 1964, 1965

Individual
 ACF Fiorentina Hall of Fame: 2013

References

External links
 

1933 births
2017 deaths
Italian footballers
Italy international footballers
Serie A players
ACF Fiorentina players
Inter Milan players
Juventus F.C. players
Association football goalkeepers
UEFA Champions League winning players
Sportspeople from the Metropolitan City of Bologna